Reunion Sports Group was an investor group which owned the former United League Baseball, an independent baseball league started in 2005.  Owned by league co-founders John Bryant and Byron Pierce, who had left the original ownership group a few years back and then purchased the league out of bankruptcy in 2009, Reunion owned all of the franchises of United League Baseball, including the Rio Grande Valley WhiteWings, Amarillo Dillas, San Angelo Colts, Laredo Broncos, Edinburg Roadrunners, and Coastal Bend Thunder.  The group was also part of a partnership to build a proposed 10,000 seat baseball stadium to house an expansion team to begin play in 2010 in Dallas, Texas but this proposal never came to fruition.

United League Baseball
Entertainment companies of the United States